Perrow is a surname. Notable people with the surname include:

Charles Perrow (1925–2019), American sociologist
Mark Perrow (1965–2020), South African sprint canoer
Mosby Perrow Jr. (1909–1973), American lawyer and politician